Crane Creek is a census-designated place (CDP) in Mariposa County, California, United States, within Yosemite National Park. Crane Creek was first listed as a CDP for the 2020 census, at which time it had a population of 29.

Demographics

References 

Census-designated places in Mariposa County, California
Census-designated places in California